Thomas Creek may refer to:

Thomas E. Creek (1950–1969), United States Marine posthumously awarded the Medal of Honor for actions in Vietnam
Thomas Creek (North Fork Salt River tributary), a stream in Shelby County, Missouri
Thomas Creek (Oregon), a list of places in Oregon with Thomas Creek in their names, including;
 Thomas Creek (Linn County, Oregon), a stream
 Thomas Creek Bridge, a bridge over Thomas Creek in Curry County, Oregon
Thomas Creek, a creek in Santa Rosa County, Florida, site of Thomas Creek Archeological District
Tom Creek, a creek located in the Omineca Country region of British Columbia

See also
Thomas Branch (disambiguation)
Thomas Cheek (disambiguation)